Raymond Davis may refer to:

 Raymond Davis Jr. (1914–2006), American physicist and chemist, Nobel laureate in physics
 Ray Davis (musician) (1940–2005), member of The Parliaments, Parliament, Funkadelic, and The Temptations
 Ray Davis (businessman), chief executive officer of Energy Transfer Partners and owner of the Texas Rangers of Major League Baseball
 Raymond Allen Davis (born 1974), American CIA contractor accused of double murder in Pakistan in 2011
 Raymond E. Davis (1885–1965), U.S. Navy sailor and 1906 recipient of the U.S. Medal of Honor
 Raymond G. Davis (1915–2003), U.S. Marine Corps general and 1950 recipient of the U.S. Medal of Honor
 Wallace Ray Davis (1949–2007), televangelist and owner of Affiliated Media Group
 Ray E. Davis, football and baseball coach at Louisiana Tech in 1939
 Raymond Cazallis Davis (1836–1919), chief librarian at the University of Michigan

See also
 Raymond Davies (disambiguation)
 Ray Davies (born 1944), frontman of The Kinks